Boursinidia darwini is a moth of the family Noctuidae. It is found in Biobío, Araucanía and Magallanes and Antartica Chilena Regions of Chile.

The wingspan is 39–41 mm. Adults are on wing from November to December.

External links
 Noctuinae of Chile

Noctuinae
Endemic fauna of Chile